Griffin is a former settlement in Clark County, Illinois, United States. Griffin was located in Wabash Township, along a railroad line between Marshall and Dennison.

References

Geography of Clark County, Illinois
Ghost towns in Illinois